Burford is a village and civil parish in Shropshire, England.

According to the 2001 census the parish had a population of 1,108, rising to 1,392 at the 2011 Census.

Location
The parish is situated to the north of the River Teme, on the other side of the Teme is the Worcestershire town of Tenbury Wells. To the west, the A456 road bridges Ledwyche Brook, leading to the Herefordshire village of Little Hereford. To the northeast is the Shropshire village and parish of Boraston.

Amenities
Burford House Gardens is a popular destination and is located in the southwest of the parish, where the Ledwyche meets the Teme.

Even though Burford has never been in Herefordshire or Worcestershire, the fire station is run by the Hereford and Worcester Fire Service and the Tenbury Community Hospital is run by the Worcestershire Health and Care NHS Trust. The workhouse serving Burford was built in 1837.

The local civic society (Tenbury and Burford Civic Society) covers Tenbury and Burford, underlining how these settlements form one community, despite being located in different counties.

The parish church is St. Mary's (photo).

There is a public house - the Rose and Crown.

Notable people
Elizabeth of Lancaster, Duchess of Exeter (1363–1426), daughter of John of Gaunt and ultimately wife of John Cornwall, 1st Baron Fanhope, born and buried at Burford Church.
George Rushout, 3rd Baron Northwick (1811–1887), Conservative politician, born at Burford (1811) where his father was then rector.
Geoffrey Hayes (born 1950), cricketer

See also
Burford Rural District
Listed buildings in Burford, Shropshire

References

External links

Tenbury and Burford Civic Society 

Villages in Shropshire
Extremities of Shropshire
Civil parishes in Shropshire